Michael Williams (born February 19, 1984) is a former professional gridiron football defensive end. He was signed by the Austin Wranglers as a street free agent in 2009. He played college football for the Texas College Steers.

Williams was also a member of the Dallas Desperados and Edmonton Eskimos.

External links
Just Sports Stats

1984 births
Living people
American players of Canadian football
American football defensive ends
Canadian football defensive linemen
Austin Wranglers players
Dallas Desperados players
Edmonton Elks players
Texas College Steers football players
Sportspeople from Monterey, California
Players of American football from California